Melanella abida is a species of sea snail, a marine gastropod mollusk in the family Eulimidae. The species is one of many species known to exist within the genus, Melanella.

Description 
The maximum recorded shell length is 7 mm.

Habitat 
Minimum recorded depth is 538 m. Maximum recorded depth is 538 m.

References

External links

abida
Gastropods described in 1927